Sarmaturbo is an extinct genus of sea snails, marine gastropod mollusks, in the family Turbinidae, the turban snails.

Species
Species within the genus Sarmaturbo include:
 † Sarmaturbo colini (L. C. King, 1931)
 † Sarmaturbo superbus (Zittel, 1865)

References

Turbinidae
Monotypic gastropod genera